This is a list of all naval vessels ever used by the United Kingdom under the Royal Navy  and other UK maritime organisations or groups that participated in UK conflicts. This list will consist of lists of naval vessels used at specific time periods such as World War II and the Modern day as well as a list of Royal Navy ship names that will look at all Royal Navy ships ever used.

List of ships of the Royal Navy 

 List of ship names of the Royal Navy

World War II 

 List of classes of British ships of World War II

Cold War 

 List of classes of British ships of the Cold War

Modern day 

 List of active Royal Navy ships

Gallery of past and present naval vessels of the United Kingdom

References

Vessels